The Samuel M. Thomas Assembly Center is an 8,000-seat multi-purpose arena in Ruston, Louisiana. The arena, named for its benefactor and businessman Samuel M. Thomas, is home to the Division I NCAA Louisiana Tech University Bulldogs (men) and Lady Techsters (women) basketball teams. The arena also hosts concerts and events.

The arena opened in November 1982 just west of Joe Aillet Stadium, and replaced the then-30-year-old Memorial Gymnasium on the corner of Tech Drive and Railroad Avenue. The men's basketball team hosted the Southland Conference tournament in the STAC in 1985 and 1987, and four NIT games, one in 1986, two games in 2002, and one in 2015.  The women's team has hosted the first, second and regional rounds of the NCAA Women's Basketball tournament nineteen times, most recently in 2003.

The TAC also serves as the home of the Louisiana Tech Women's Volleyball team since the program's inception in 1987.

NBA greats including Karl Malone, P.J. Brown, Randy White and Paul Millsap have called the Samuel Thomas Assembly Center home during their collegiate careers.

See also
List of convention centers in the United States
List of NCAA Division I basketball arenas

References

Indoor arenas in Louisiana
College basketball venues in the United States
College volleyball venues in the United States
Convention centers in Louisiana
Louisiana Tech Bulldogs and Lady Techsters basketball
Sports venues in Ruston, Louisiana
Sports venues in Louisiana
Basketball venues in Louisiana
Volleyball venues in Louisiana
Louisiana Tech University
Music venues in Louisiana
Buildings and structures in Lincoln Parish, Louisiana
Sports venues completed in 1982
1982 establishments in Louisiana